Charles Austin Coolidge, Jr. (July 19, 1844 – June 1, 1926) was a United States Army soldier who served in the American Civil War, the American West, Spanish–American War, and in Asia before retiring in 1903 as a brigadier general.

Early life, education & marriage
Charles Austin Coolidge, Jr. was born on July 19, 1844 in Boston, Massachusetts to Charles Austin Coolidge, Sr. and Anna Maria (Rice) Coolidge. He attended Norwich University in Northfield, Vermont from 1859 to 1861; in 1903 Norwich conferred his bachelor's degree as a member of the class of 1863.  Later he received his M.D. from the Wooster Medical College in Wooster, Ohio. He married Sophia Wager Lowry in Tallahassee, Florida on 19 November 1867; she was the daughter of Philip Lowry and Caroline Tilghman of Philadelphia.

Military career
On 23 Oct 1862, Coolidge enlisted in the United States Army as a private in the 16th Massachusetts Volunteer Infantry. In May 1864 he was appointed Second Lieutenant of the Seventh Infantry Regiment. The Seventh at that time was on duty in New York, having just come from Gettysburg for the draft riots. Following a month of service at City Point, Virginia, the regiment remained at New York harbor until the end of the war. The regiment was then sent to Florida for the next five years.

After his unit was transferred to the American West in 1870, Lieutenant Coolidge was a member of Captain Brown's command which opposed Chief Joseph's Nez Percé Indians at Lolo Pass. He was wounded in this campaign at the Battle of the Big Hole on August 9, 1877.  Later when appointed a Captain, he served in Montana, Dakota Territory, Fort Snelling, Fort D.A. Russell (Wyoming), Rock Springs, Wyoming, and Fort Logan near Denver, Colorado.

At the outbreak of the Spanish–American War in April 1898, Coolidge attained the rank of Major in the Seventh Infantry Regiment. He participated in the capture of El Caney on July 1, 1898 and the bombardment of Santiago de Cuba.

Coolidge was promoted to Lieutenant Colonel of the Ninth Infantry Regiment on May 16, 1899, and he took part in the engagements at Zapote Bridge and Tarlac, Philippine Islands. In June 1900 the regiment was ordered to China as part of the China Relief Expedition. He assumed command following the death of Colonel Emerson H. Liscum during the Boxer Rebellion as part of the Allies relief of the Legation at Tianjin from June to July 1900. After the departure of Colonel Robert Leamy Meade of the Marines from China on July 26, 1900, Lieutenant Colonel Coolidge was placed in command of the American forces in China until the arrival of General Adna Chaffee in early August 1900. Also during the Boxer Rebellion on August 14, 1900 he led the first American force to enter the Forbidden City in Beijing.

In 1901 Coolidge was named Colonel of the Seventh Infantry Regiment, transferred to the Presidio of San Francisco, where he retired August 8, 1903 as a Brigadier General.

Retirement and death
Coolidge moved to Detroit shortly after the San Francisco earthquake in August 1906.  He had been exceptionally active in work of military veterans' organizations and he was a member of the Loyal Legion, the GAR, Sons of the American Revolution and the United Spanish War Veterans.

He was a Councilor of the Boy Scouts of America and a President of the American Philatelic Society.  He was admitted to the Detroit Post of the GAR in 1906, elected Junior Commander two years later and named Commander in 1912.

Brigadier General Charles Austin Coolidge died June 2, 1926 at Grace Hospital in Detroit, Michigan in his eighty-first year.  He had been ill since May 19, 1926 when he suffered a stroke while attending the Lloyd Tilghman monument unveiling at Vicksburg, Mississippi. He was buried at Arlington National Cemetery.

Military awards
General Coolidge earned the following military awards:
     Civil War Campaign Medal 
     Indian Campaign Medal
     Spanish Campaign Medal
     Philippine Campaign Medal
     China Relief Expedition Medal

Family relations & genealogy
Charles A. Coolidge and his wife Sophie in 1870 adopted a son, Sherman Coolidge (1862–1932) of Arapahoe ancestry, who became a prominent leader in the Native American community. General Coolidge was the son of Charles and Anna Maria Rice Coolidge. He was a direct descendant of John Coolidge (1604–1691) who emigrated from England about 1630 to Watertown, Massachusetts, and he was a cousin of President Coolidge. His grandfather Henry Rice was a member of the Boston City Council and was a Massachusetts state legislator. He was also a descendant of Edmund Rice another early immigrant to Massachusetts Bay Colony as follows:
 Brig. Gen Charles A. Coolidge (1844–1926), son of
 Anna Maria Rice (1817–1886), daughter of
 Henry Rice (1786–1867), son of
 Noah Rice (1751–1820), son of
 Jabez Rice (1702–1783), son of
 Caleb Rice (1666–1739), son of
 Joseph Rice (1637–1711), son of
 Edmund Rice, (c. 1594–1663)

References

External links
 Arlington National Cemetery

1844 births
1926 deaths
Burials at Arlington National Cemetery
Coolidge family
College of Wooster alumni
Norwich University alumni
People of Massachusetts in the American Civil War
Sons of the American Revolution
Union Army soldiers
United States Army generals